Bathydrilus is a genus of clitellate oligochaete worms.

Species 
The following species are accepted in the genus Bathydrilus:

 Bathydrilus adriaticus (Hrabĕ, 1971)
 Bathydrilus ampliductus Erséus, 1997
 Bathydrilus argentinae Erséus, 1983
 Bathydrilus asymmetricus Cook, 1970
 Bathydrilus atlanticus Erséus, 1979
 Bathydrilus connexus Erséus, 1988
 Bathydrilus desbruyeresi Erséus, 1983
 Bathydrilus difficilis Erséus & Wang, 2005
 Bathydrilus edwardsi Erséus, 1984
 Bathydrilus egenus Erséus, 1990
 Bathydrilus exilis Erséus & Davis, 1989
 Bathydrilus formosus Erséus, 1986
 Bathydrilus fortis Erséus, 1997
 Bathydrilus graciliatriatus Erséus, 1979
 Bathydrilus hadalis Erséus, 1979
 Bathydrilus ingens Erséus, 1986
 Bathydrilus litoreus Baker, 1983
 Bathydrilus longiatriatus Erséus, 1983
 Bathydrilus longus Erséus, 1979
 Bathydrilus macroprostatus Erséus, 1986
 Bathydrilus medius Erséus, 1983
 Bathydrilus meridianus Erséus, 1979
 Bathydrilus munitus Erséus, 1990
 Bathydrilus notabilis Erséus & Milligan, 1988
 Bathydrilus paramunitus Erséus & Wang, 2003
 Bathydrilus parkeri Erséus, 1991
 Bathydrilus rarisetis (Erséus, 1975) 
 Bathydrilus rohdei  (Jamieson, 1977) 
 Bathydrilus rusticus Erséus, 1991
 Bathydrilus sandersi Erséus, 1983
 Bathydrilus superiovasatus Erséus, 1981
 Bathydrilus torosus Baker, 1983
 Bathydrilus vetustus Erséus, 1990

References

Further reading
Diaz, Robert J., and Christer Erseus. "Habitat preferences and species associations of shallow-water marine Tubificidae (Oligochaeta) from the barrier reef ecosystems off Belize, Central America." Aquatic Oligochaete Biology V. Springer Netherlands, 1994. 93-105. 
Erseus, Christer. "A generic revision of the Phallodrilinae (Oligochaeta, Tubificidae)." Zoologica Scripta 21.1 (1992): 5-48.

Tubificina